Henry Bedford may refer to:

* Henry Bedford (educator) (1816–1903), English Catholic convert, educator and writer
 Henry Bedford (cricketer) (1854–?), English cricketer
 Henry Edward Bedford (1860–1932), American painter and sculptor

See also
 Harry Bedford (disambiguation)